Monroe County is a county on the northeast border of the U.S. state of Mississippi next to Alabama. As of the 2020 census, the population was 34,180. Its county seat is Aberdeen.

History 
The county is named in honor of James Monroe, the fifth President of the United States. Part of the county east of the Tombigbee River originally made-up part of the Alabama Territory, belonging to Marion County, until new lines of demarcation put it in the State of Mississippi in 1821.

Geography

In 1922, the Commissioner of Agriculture for the county published a report in a local newspaper which described in some detail the soil conditions and agriculture of the county.  He described the areas as the Black Lands and the soil as black lime, a "stiff" soil, derived from the Selma chalk formation and extremely rich in potassium and phosphorus.

Flora 
Sweet clover is an indigenous wild ground cover in the county.

Major highways
  U.S. Highway 45
  U.S. Highway 278
  Mississippi Highway 6
  Mississippi Highway 8
  Mississippi Highway 25
  Mississippi Highway 145

Adjacent counties
 Lowndes County (south)
 Clay County (southwest)
 Chickasaw County (west)
 Lee County (northwest)
 Itawamba County (north)
 Lamar County, Alabama (east)
 Marion County, Alabama (northeast)

Demographics

2020 census

As of the 2020 United States Census, there were 34,180 people, 13,966 households, and 9,122 families residing in the county.

2000 census
As of the census of 2000, there were 38,014 people, 14,603 households, and 10,660 families residing in the county.  The population density was 50 people per square mile (19/km2).  There were 16,236 housing units at an average density of 21 per square mile (8/km2).  The racial makeup of the county was 68.37% White, 30.77% Black or African American, 0.10% Native American, 0.17% Asian, 0.01% Pacific Islander, 0.11% from other races, and 0.47% from two or more races.  0.69% of the population were Hispanic or Latino of any race.

There were 14,603 households, out of which 34.70% had children under the age of 18 living with them, 52.00% were married couples living together, 17.20% had a female householder with no husband present, and 27.00% were non-families. 24.70% of all households were made up of individuals, and 11.80% had someone living alone who was 65 years of age or older.  The average household size was 2.57 and the average family size was 3.07.

In the county, the population was spread out, with 27.20% under the age of 18, 8.70% from 18 to 24, 27.60% from 25 to 44, 22.50% from 45 to 64, and 14.00% who were 65 years of age or older.  The median age was 36 years. For every 100 females there were 89.70 males.  For every 100 females age 18 and over, there were 84.70 males.

The median income for a household in the county was $30,307, and the median income for a family was $36,749. Males had a median income of $30,232 versus $20,411 for females. The per capita income for the county was $14,072.  About 13.60% of families and 17.20% of the population were below the poverty line, including 22.30% of those under age 18 and 21.70% of those age 65 or over.

Economy 
 both the largest creamery and the largest hog-feeding plant "in the South" were located in the county.

 corn was the most important grain crop grown in the county.  Corn was typically planted after the planting and harvest of a crop of clover or oats.  At that time, oat crops typically yielded forty to sixty bushels per acre.  Other crops grown, either for harvest or pasture, included wheat, rye, barley, rape, cotton, Japan clover.  Monroe had the largest acreage devoted to alfalfa production and exported more alfalfa hay than any other county in the state.

As of 2021, US Silica operates a bentonite mine located several miles south of Aberdeen, near the community of Darracott, where bentonite is extracted before being refined into petrochemicals and animal feed.

Communities

Cities
 Aberdeen (county seat)
 Amory

Towns
 Hatley
 Nettleton (partly in Lee County)
 Smithville

Village
 Gattman

Census-designated places
 Hamilton

Other unincorporated communities

 Athens
 Bartahatchie
 Becker
 Bigbee
 Binford
 Bristow
 Central Grove
 Darracott
 Flinn
 Gibson
 Greenwood Springs
 Lackey
 Mormon Springs
 Muldon
 Parham
 Prairie
 Quincy
 Riggins
 Sipsey Fork
 Splunge
 Strong
 Tranquil
 Westville
 Wise Gap
 Wren

Ghost towns
 Bolivar
 Camargo
 Cotton Gin Port

Politics

See also
 National Register of Historic Places listings in Monroe County, Mississippi
 Camp Seminole, Pushmataha Area Council

References

 
Mississippi counties
1821 establishments in Mississippi
Populated places established in 1821
Counties of Appalachia